Čestice may refer to places in the Czech Republic:

Čestice (Strakonice District), a market town in the South Bohemian Region
Čestice (Rychnov nad Kněžnou District), a municipality and village in the Hradec Králové Region